The Italian submarine Delfino (“Dolphin”) was built at the end of the 19th century and was the first submarine of  the Regia Marina. She remained in service until the end of the First World War.

Design and construction
Delfino was designed by marine engineer Giacinto Pullino at the La Spezia Navy Yard. Accounts vary as to the date of her construction; it seems that she was built as an experimental craft and was under trials for several years before being accepted by the Italian Navy.

Delfino was laid down in 1889, launched in 1890 and completed in 1892. She commenced trials on April 1892 which continued until April 1895, when she was commissioned into the Regia Marina. (Her official records say she was built between 1892 and 1895, and was commissioned in 1896)

She was controlled by vertical rudders two aft and unusually one forward) and horizontal planes fore and aft. She also had two vertical axis propellers to power vertical movement underwater, but these proved to give little advantage. She was armed with one  torpedo tube and had a complement of 8 crewmen.

Service career
Delfino was commissioned on 1 April 1895 (official records say 1896) and she served with the Regia Marina into the 20th century. She was still in service at the outbreak of World War I and saw action in the Adriatic, carrying out some 44 war patrols, though she also served as a training vessel. At the end of hostilities Delfino was moved into reserve, and was stricken in January 1919.

References

External links
 Delfino (1890)  Marina Militare website

1890 ships
19th-century submarines
Ships built in La Spezia
World War I submarines of Italy